Quadrumvirs may refer to:

In ancient Rome,  quadrumvir was an elective post assigned to four citizens having police and jurisdiction power, elected by the Senate. The term is cognate with triumvir and duumvir, respectively describing a post of three and two people, which gave rise to the better-known extant terms triumvirate and diumvirate.

At the beginning of Italian Fascism, they were a group of four leaders that led Benito Mussolini's March on Rome in October 1922. They were all involved in the Fascist party under Mussolini and had been involved in politics and/or war leading up to the Fascist dictatorship. They were:
Michele Bianchi, a revolutionary syndicalist leader
Emilio De Bono, a leading Italian General who had fought in World War I
Cesare Maria De Vecchi, a member of the Italian Chamber of Deputies, as well as a colonial administrator
Italo Balbo, a Blackshirt leader and leader of the Ferrara Fascist organisation

See also
Grand Council of Fascism

Political history of Italy
1922 in Italy
Italian Fascism
1922 in politics
+